Theodore "Ted" Boronovskis (born 27 July 1943) is an Australian judoka who won a bronze medal at the 1964 Summer Olympics. This was Australia's only Olympic medal in judo until 2000.

Judo made its Olympic debut in 1964, and Boronovskis was Australia's only judo representative, competing in the open (unlimited weight) division. He won his first two matches, but then lost to the eventual gold medalist, Anton Geesink.

References

1943 births
Living people
Judoka at the 1964 Summer Olympics
Australian male judoka
Olympic judoka of Australia
Olympic bronze medalists for Australia
Olympic medalists in judo
Australian people of Latvian descent
Medalists at the 1964 Summer Olympics